Fotis Zannis (born 3 January 2003) is a Greek professional footballer who plays as a centre-back for Super League 2 club Asteras Vlachioti, on loan from Atromitos.

References

2003 births
Living people
Greek footballers
Super League Greece 2 players
Atromitos F.C. players
Association football defenders